Jim Crockett Promotions was a professional wrestling promotion headquartered in Charlotte, North Carolina, United States that traded from 1931 to 1988. The name was revived for a separate promotion that held its first show in July 2022.

Alumni

Footnotes

See also
List of World Championship Wrestling alumni

References

External links

Alumni
Jim Crockett Promotions alumni